Senna holosericea is a perennial herb with yellow flowers that is native to the Arabian peninsula, Chad, Djibouti, Egypt, Eritrea, Ethiopia, India,  Pakistan, Socotra, Somalia and Sudan.

Habitat
Senna holosericea is widespread in drier areas and is also common on coastal plains.

Description
Senna holosericea is a prostrate or ascending perennial herb that grows to 0.5m tall.  Its stems are densely hairy with spreading hairs.  The leaves are 5–15 cm long, paripinnate with 4-8 pairs of leaflets, eglandular; leaflets oblong- elliptic and densely pubescent.  Flowers are yellow in long axillary and terminal racemes.  Has five petals, and ten stamens, anthers unequal in size: 2 large, 7mm long; 5 medium-sized, 2–3 mm long and 3 small, 1mm long.  Has pods that are oblong, slightly curved and conspicuously hairy.  Seeds are triangular, 4.5-5.5 X 2.6-4mm.

Uses
The leaves are moist and mucilaginous and were traditionally used in Dhofar as cleaning material to wipe writing boards.

References

holosericea